The Betty Gilderdale Award, also known as the Storylines Betty Gilderdale Award, is a New Zealand award given to an individual for outstanding service to children's literature and literacy. Before 2000 the award was known as the Children's Literature Association's Award for Services to Children's Literature. It was renamed in honour of the children's author Betty Gilderdale.

Recipients of the award received a cash prize of $2000 and deliver the Storylines Spring Lecture.

Previous recipients of the award include:

References

External links 
 Official website

New Zealand children's literary awards